The Prizren–Timok dialect is the name given by Serbian linguists to classify transitional Torlakian dialects spoken in Eastern and South Serbia and Kosovo — an area spanning from Prizren in the south to the Timok River in the north — as sub-dialects of Old-Shtokavian. Its eastern border, starting from Zaječar, roughly forms the border with Bulgaria.

Sub-dialects
 Prizren–South Morava
 Vranje
 Gora
 Svrljig–Zaplanje
 Timok–Lužnica
 Pirot
 Crna Trava
 Lužnica

Notes

References

Further reading
Динић, Јакша. Тимочки дијалекатски речник. Vol. 4. Ин-т за српски језик САНУ, 2008.

Dialects of Serbo-Croatian
Serbian dialects
Kosovo Serbs
Southern and Eastern Serbia